Lee Jeong-myung (born September 8, 1967) is a retired female tennis player from South Korea, who represented her native country at the 1988 Summer Olympics in Seoul, South Korea.

ITF Finals

Singles (0–1)

Doubles (12–3)

References

External links
 
 

1967 births
Living people
South Korean female tennis players
Tennis players at the 1988 Summer Olympics
Olympic tennis players of South Korea
Place of birth missing (living people)
Asian Games medalists in tennis
Tennis players at the 1990 Asian Games
Medalists at the 1990 Asian Games
Asian Games silver medalists for South Korea
Asian Games bronze medalists for South Korea
Universiade medalists in tennis
Universiade bronze medalists for South Korea
Universiade silver medalists for South Korea
Medalists at the 1987 Summer Universiade
20th-century South Korean women